2014 sees the 30th edition of the Sri Lanka Football Premier League. This season features 22 teams, an expansion of two clubs.
Air Force SC are defending champions. In this season Solid SC wins the champions title after joining the league 2 years ago. The teams played round-robin matches.

Clubs

Table

Champions 
Solid SC from Anuradhapura are the Champions of Sri Lanka Football Premier League 2014-15 season.

References
FIFA.com
RSSSF.com
Soccerway.com
Football.lk

Sri Lanka Football Premier League seasons
1
Sri Lanka